Spilotes is a genus of snakes in the family Colubridae. The genus is endemic to the New World.

Geographic range
Species in the genus Spilotes are found in Mexico, Central America, and South America.

Species
Two species are recognized as being valid.

Spilotes pullatus 
Spilotes sulphureus 

Nota bene: A binomial authority in parentheses indicates that the species was originally described in a genus other than Spilotes.

References

Further reading
Boulenger GA (1894). Catalogue of the Snakes in the British Museum (Natural History). Volume II., Containing the Conclusion of the Colubridæ Aglyphæ. London: Trustees of the British Museum (Natural History). (Taylor and Francis, printers). xi + 382 pp. + Plates I-XX. (Genus Spilotes, p. 23).
Wagler J (1830). Natürliches System der AMPHIBIEN, mit vorangehender classification der SÄUGTHIERE und VÖGEL. Ein Beitrag zur vergleichenden Zoologie. Munich, Stuttgart and Tübingen: J.G. Cotta. vi + 354 pp. + one plate. (Spilotes, new genus, p. 179). (in German and Latin).

Spilotes
Snake genera